Fawad Khan may refer to:
 Fawad Khan, Pakistani actor, model and singer
 Fawad Khan (cricketer), Pakistani cricketer